Diplopseustis prophetica is a moth in the family Crambidae. It was described by Edward Meyrick in 1887. It is found in Australia, where it has been recorded from Victoria.

The wingspan is about 14 mm. The forewings are pale brownish ochreous, the base of the costa suffused with dark fuscous. The hindwings are pale whitish ochreous, becoming pale brownish ochreous towards the hindmargin.

References

Spilomelinae
Endemic fauna of Australia
Moths described in 1887
Moths of Australia
Taxa named by Edward Meyrick